Shawn M. Galloway (born 1976) is an American author, workplace safety consultant and professional speaker. He is the chief executive officer of ProAct Safety, a safety consulting firm. He is best known for his books, STEPS to Safety Culture Excellence, Forecasting Tomorrow: The Future of Safety Excellence and Inside Strategy: Value Creation from Within Your Organization.

Life and education
Galloway did his schooling in Clinton, New Jersey and in Houston, Texas. He joined the United States Army as an enlisted soldier in 1993, serving for 8 years, and also in the Texas Army National Guard and Army Reserves. He attended the University of Phoenix to pursue his degree in business management.

Shawn lives in Houston, Texas. He is also the co-owner of Galloway Cattle Company with operations in Hockley, Texas.

Career
After college, Galloway worked for Offset Services for a year and later was hired by Fluor Daniel in 1997 to help start their Photogammetry Engineering offerings.

In 2003, he joined ATR which led him to be recruited at ProAct Safety in 2005 as a Managing Consultant. In 2008, he was named president and chief operating officer, and as of July 2021, he serves as the CEO of the company.

Since January 2008, Galloway hosts a weekly podcast called Safety Culture Excellence®. He also speaks frequently at American Society of Safety Professionals (ASSP) conferences and events.

Books
2013 – STEPS to Safety Culture Excellence  (co-authored by Terry L. Mathis)
2013 –  AHMP 3rd Edition Hazardous Materials Management Desk Reference 
2015 – Forecasting Tomorrow: The Future of Safety Excellence  (co-authored by Terry L. Mathis)
2016 – Inside Strategy: Value Creation from Within Your Organization  (co-authored by Terry L. Mathis)
2017 – Lean Behavior-Based Safety: BBS for Today's Realities  (co-authored by Terry L. Mathis)
2023 – COACH: A Safety Leadership Fable

Recognition
Galloway was featured in NSC Rising Stars of Safety list by National Safety Council and 50 People Who Most Influenced EHS list by EHS Today. He was also recognized in the POWER 101 – Leaders of the EHS World list, Up and Coming Thought Leaders list and 50 Leaders for Today and Tomorrow list by ISHN magazine. In 2016, he received the significant contributor award from ASSP Council on Practices and Standards.

References

1976 births
Living people
American business writers
American management consultants
Business speakers
University of Houston alumni
Writers from Houston
People from Spring, Texas
Texas National Guard personnel
University of Phoenix alumni
Writers from Texas
People from San Jacinto County, Texas
United States Army soldiers
United States Army reservists